The following is an overview of public housing estates in the Kai Tak development area, Kowloon City District, Hong Kong, including Home Ownership Scheme (HOS), Private Sector Participation Scheme (PSPS), and Tenants Purchase Scheme (TPS) estates.

History 
In 1998, the Hong Kong International Airport relocated to Chek Lap Kok, clearing the way for a redevelopment of the Kai Tak lands. In 2006, the Planning Department outlined plans to build two new public estates on part of this brownfield site. The two estates, called Kai Ching (啟晴) and Tak Long (德朗), opened on the former north apron in 2013/2014.

Overview

Kai Ching Estate 

Kai Ching Estate consists of six residential buildings completed in 2013. It houses around 5,200 flats for 13,300 residents and shares the "Ching Long Shopping Centre" with Tak Long Estate. Kai Ching Estate was built by China State Construction Engineering (Hong Kong).

Like other public housing estates in Hong Kong, the construction of Kai Ching Estate made use of prefabricated components including precast facades and staircases, semi-precast slabs, and precast kitchens and bathrooms. Kai Ching was also a pilot estate for the use of precast water taps.

The estate incorporates a number of energy and water saving features. Renewable energy sources include solar panels on the housing block rooftops, and lift motors that can generate power when the lift is carrying a heavy load down, a light load up, or under braking conditions. A district cooling system cools non-domestic facilities including the shops, kindergartens, and estate offices. A rainwater collection system is used for irrigation.

In 2014, one resident of Lok Ching House shot and killed another resident, sparking a 12-hour standoff with police. The gunman, a mainland immigrant, shot himself and was declared dead in hospital. He was suspected of suffering from mental problems and had previously been jailed for assault.

In 2015, water samples from Kai Ching Estate were found to be contaminated with lead, sparking a citywide scandal and the discovery of contaminated drinking water at many other buildings. Pipe soldering samples taken from Kai Ching Estate contained 50 per cent lead. In addition, Legionella bacteria was discovered at Mun Ching House.

Houses

Tak Long Estate 

Tak Long Estate consists of nine residential blocks completed in 2013. It shares the "Ching Long Shopping Centre" with Kai Ching Estate.

Houses 

Tak Long Estate is in Primary One Admission (POA) School Net 34. Within the school net are multiple aided schools (operated independently but funded with government money) and two government schools: Farm Road Government Primary School and Ma Tau Chung Government Primary School.

De Novo 

De Novo is a housing estate of the Urban Renewal Authority comprising four residential blocks and a two-storey commercial complex. It provides 484 flats of between 330 and 670 square feet each. Urban renewal in Hong Kong typically involves wholesale demolition of old urban districts and their replacement with high-end commercial and housing developments. Therefore, this project is intended to accommodate residents displaced by urban renewal projects. De Novo is being constructed directly to the west of Tak Long Estate.

In April 2015, it was reported that some of the flats at De Novo will be offered up for subsidised sale at about 75 per cent of the market value. The scheme will target families who cannot afford private housing, but who are too rich to qualify for the Home Ownership Scheme.

In light of the ongoing lead-in-drinking water scandal, the URA assured prospective buyers that plumbers made use of silver welding materials, and that experts were on hand to ensure no materials with lead were used. However, the Apple Daily newspaper took samples from each of De Novo's four blocks and found lead contamination up to 30 percent above the acceptable limit.

Kai Long Court

Transportation
The estates are in proximity to Kai Tak station of the Mass Transit Railway. In February 2013, five of the eventual 25 pedestrian links to the Kai Tai development area were completed. Four bus routes will also service the estates.

Kai Tak Cruise Terminal is also located nearby.

See also
 Public housing in Hong Kong
 List of public housing estates in Hong Kong

References